Isoxazole is an electron-rich azole with an oxygen atom next to the nitrogen. It is also the class of compounds containing this ring. Isoxazolyl is the univalent radical derived from isoxazole.

Occurrence
Isoxazole rings are found in some natural products, such as ibotenic acid and muscimol.

Synthesis
Isoxazole can be synthesised via a variety of methods.
Examples include via a 1,3-dipolar cycloaddition of nitrile oxides with alkynes; or the reaction of hydroxylamine with 1,3-diketones or derivatives of propiolic acid.

Photochemistry
The photolysis of isoxazole was first reported in 1966. Due to the weak N-O bond, the isoxazole ring tends to collapse under UV irradiation, rearranging to oxazole through azirine intermediate. Meanwhile, the azirine intermediate can react with nucleophiles, especially carboxylic acids. Given the photoreactions, isoxazole group is developed as a native photo-cross-linker for photoaffinity labeling and chemoproteomic studies.

Pharmaceuticals and herbicides
Isoxazoles also form the basis for a number of drugs, including the COX-2 inhibitor valdecoxib (Bextra) and a neurotransmitter agonist AMPA. A derivative, furoxan, is a nitric oxide donor. An isoxazolyl group is found in many beta-lactamase-resistant antibiotics, such as cloxacillin, dicloxacillin and flucloxacillin. Leflunomide is an isoxazole-derivative drug. Examples of AAS containing the isoxazole ring include danazol and androisoxazole.  A number of pesticides are isoxazoles.

See also
Oxazole, an analog with the nitrogen atom in position 3
Pyrrole, an analog without the oxygen atom
Furan, an analog without the nitrogen atom
Simple aromatic rings

References

External links
 Synthesis of isoxazoles (overview of recent methods)

 
Simple aromatic rings